Amontillado is a variety of sherry wine characterised by being darker than fino but lighter than oloroso. It is named after the Montilla region of Spain, where the style originated in the 18th century, although the name "Amontillado" is sometimes used commercially as a simple measure of colour to label any sherry lying between a fino and an oloroso. It features prominently in the Edgar Allan Poe short story "The Cask of Amontillado".

An Amontillado sherry begins as a fino, fortified to approximately 15.5% alcohol with a cap of flor yeast limiting its exposure to the air. A cask of fino is considered to be amontillado if the layer of flor fails to develop adequately, is intentionally killed by additional fortification, or is allowed to die off through non-replenishment. Without the layer of flor, amontillado must be fortified to approximately 17.5% alcohol so that it does not oxidise too quickly. After the additional fortification, Amontillado oxidises slowly, exposed to oxygen through the slightly porous American or Canadian oak casks, and gains a darker colour and richer flavour than fino.

Amontillado is characterized by nutty aromas, tobacco, aromatic herbs and often ethereal, polished notes of oak. The fusion of two different ageing processes gives Amontillado wines a specific flavour.

Varieties 
Amontillado can be produced in several different manners. A fino amontillado is a wine that has begun the transformation from a fino to an amontillado, but has not been aged long enough to complete the process. Amontillado del puerto is an amontillado made in El Puerto de Santa María. Naturally dry, they are sometimes sold lightly to medium sweetened but these can no longer be labelled as amontillado. On 12 April 2012, the rules applicable to the sweet and fortified denominations of origin Montilla-Moriles and Jerez-Xérès-Sherry were changed to prohibit sweet amontillado. They have to be labelled as Medium Sherry: blend of Amontillado or suchlike.

The classification by sweetness is:

Serving 

Amontillado is usually served slightly chilled and may be served either as an apéritif or as an accompaniment to food such as chicken or rabbit. Classically it was served with a fine, or thin, soup, such as a beef consommé.

Storing
Due to its oxidative aging and preparation, amontillado is more stable than fino and may be stored for a few years before opening. After opening, it can be kept for up to two weeks, if corked and refrigerated.

References

Further reading

Sherry